The 1996 NCAA Division I-AA football season, part of college football in the United States organized by the National Collegiate Athletic Association at the Division I-AA level, began in August 1996, and concluded with the 1996 NCAA Division I-AA Football Championship Game on December 21, 1996, at Marshall University Stadium in Huntington, West Virginia. The Marshall Thundering Herd won their second I-AA championship, defeating the defending national champion Montana Grizzlies by a score of 49–29.

Conference changes and new programs
The American West Conference disbanded following the 1995 season and its four remaining members either became independents (Cal Poly, Sacramento State, and Southern Utah) or joined the Big Sky (Cal State Northridge).
Prior to the season, the Northeast Conference, a preexisting Division I conference, announced it would add football for its five members that sponsored the sport.

Conference standings

Conference champions

Postseason
The location of the title game, Marshall University Stadium, was determined before the playoffs started.

NCAA Division I-AA playoff bracket

* Denotes host institution

Source:

References